The men's 200m individual medley events at the 2022 World Para Swimming Championships were held at the Penteada Olympic Swimming Complex in Madeira between 12 and 18 June.

Medalists

Results

SM5

SM6

SM7
Final
Seven swimmers from six nations took part.

SM8

SM9
Final
Eight swimmers from seven nations took part.

SM10
Final
Eight swimmers from six nations took part.

SM11
Final
Five swimmers from five nations took part.

SM13

SM14

References

2022 World Para Swimming Championships